Castle is an electoral ward and community in the City and County of Swansea, Wales, UK.  Castle covers most of the heart of the City of Swansea, with Swansea Castle at its centre.

Description
The electoral ward matches the community boundaries and consists of some or all of the following areas: Swansea city centre, Brynmelin, Dyfatty, Greenhill, parts of Mount Pleasant, Sandfields and Waun Wen in the parliamentary constituency of Swansea West.  The ward borders the wards of St. Thomas to the east; Landore and Cwmbwrla to the north; Townhill and Uplands; and Waterfront to the south.

For electoral purposes, Castle is divided into a number of polling districts: City Centre, Sandfields, George Street,  Mount Pleasant, XE1 High Street, XE2 High Street, North Hill, Baptist Well, XH1 Brynmelin and XH2 Brynmelin.  Castle returns 4 councillors to the local council.

The Castle ward is a Communities First area.

The community does not have its own community council.

2021 boundary review
Following a local government boundary review, the Maritime Quarter area of Castle was removed to form part of a new Waterfront ward (and community), effective from the 2022 local elections. Despite being reduced in size, Castle ward continues to elect four county councillors.

Demographics
The overall population in the Castle ward and community  according to the 2011 UK Census was 15,883.

They had an ethnic breakdown of:

Ethnic breakdown:

The number of people identifying themselves as Welsh was 7,321 (46.1%), Considerably lower than the figure for the county as a whole.

Local election results

Since 1995 the Castle Ward has been a four-member ward for the purposes of City and County of Swansea Council elections. The ward is a major Labour Party stronghold.

2017

2012
Following the May 2012 election the ward was represented by four Labour Party councillors:

Prior to the 2012 election the City and County of Swansea councillors for Castle Ward were:
Erika Kirchner, Labour
Alan Lloyd, Labour
David Phillips, Labour

Councillor Barbara Hynes, who had represented Castle for 21 years, died in September 2011 resulting in a byelection.

2008
In the 2008 local elections, there were 21 candidates, each hoping to secure one of four seats.  All four sitting Labour councillors were looking to retain their seats.  However, the Conservatives, Plaid Cymru and the Liberal Democrats were all fielding four candidates each.  The other candidate who was hoping to take a seat represented the Socialist Party.

1999
In 1999, the number of seats increased from three to four. David Phillips had previously represented the Uplands ward.

1995
The first election to the new unitary City and County of Swansea Council took place in 1995. All three seats were won by Labour.

1889
Castle was one of the ten wards created to Swansea County Borough Council, electing two representatives in the November 1889 elections. The election was fought on local issues and the winning candidates had no party affiliation.

* = sitting councillor prior to the election

References

External links
Castle ward

Swansea electoral wards
Communities in Swansea